Dhing Assembly constituency is one of the 126 assembly constituencies of Assam Legislative Assembly. Dhing forms part of the Kaliabor Lok Sabha constituency in the Indian state of Assam.

Dhing Assembly constituency

Following are details on Dhing Assembly constituency-

Country: India.
 State: Assam.
 District: Nagaon district .
 Lok Sabha Constituency: Kaliabor Lok Sabha/Parliamentary constituency.
 Assembly Categorisation: Rural constituency.
 Literacy Level:73.78%.
 Eligible Electors as per 2021 General Elections: 2,31,156 Eligible Electors. Male Electors:1,19,372. Female Electors:1,11,764 .
 Geographic Co-Ordinates: 26°27'27.7"N 92°28'55.9"E.
 Total Area Covered:  135 square kilometres.
 Area Includes:Dhing mouza in Dhing thana, Alitangani mouza in Rupohihat thana in Nowgong sub-division; and Moirabari mouza in Laharighat thana in Marigaon sub-division, of Nagaon district of Assam.
 Inter State Border :Nagaon.
 Number Of Polling Stations: Year 2011-183,Year 2016-210,Year 2021-83.

Members of Legislative Assembly

Following is the list of past members representing Dhemaji Assembly constituency in Assam Legislature-

 1957: Nurul Islam, Indian National Congress.
 1962: Mvi. Md. Idrish, Indian National Congress.
 1967: Samsul Huda, Independent.
 1972: Abul Hussain Mir, Indian National Congress.
 1978: Samsul Huda, Revolutionary Communist Party of India.
 1983: Abu Nasar Ohid, Indian National Congress.
 1985: Shahidul Islam, Independent.
 1991: Muzibar Rahman, Indian National Congress.
 1996: Mustafa Shahidul Islam, Indian National Congress.
 2001: Idris Ali, Indian National Congress.
 2006: Mobarak Ali Pathan, All India United Democratic Front.
 2011: Aminul Islam, All India United Democratic Front.
 2016: Aminul Islam, All India United Democratic Front.
 2021: Aminul Islam, All India United Democratic Front.

Election results

2016 result

References

External links 
 

Assembly constituencies of Assam
Nagaon district